David ibn Ya'ish (c. 1375) was a Spanish Jewish writer. Moses ha-Kohen de Tordesillas dedicated his work to him. Representative of the community of Seville and contemporary of Asher b. Jehiel. He was probably a brother of Solomon b. Abraham ibn Ya'ish and the father of the Solomon b. David ibn Ya'ish mentioned by Judah b. Asher ("Zikron Yehudah," p. 12a).

Notes

References
Ibn Verga, Shebeṭ Yehudah, 18, 31;
Grätz, Gesch. vii. 541 et seq.;
Steinschneider, Hebr. Uebers. pp. 686, 939;
Hebr. Bibl. vi. 115 (on the identity), xvii. 119, xix. 93 et seq.;
Jost's Annalen, i. 231, 302;
Asher b. Jehiel, Responsa, Nos. 13, 2; 18, 1.D. M. K.

14th-century Sephardi Jews